Mohammad Faisal Hussain Khan (born 3 August 1966) is an Indian actor who appears in Hindi films. He is famous for his role as Shankar Shane in Mela (2000).

Family background
Khan is the son of producer Tahir Hussain. His brother is Aamir Khan, who is an actor and producer, and he has two sisters, Nikhat Khan, who is a producer, and Farhat Khan. His uncle Nasir Hussain was a producer and director. His nephew Imran Khan is an actor and his cousin Tariq Khan was an actor in the 1970s and 1980s. He is related to Maulana Abul Kalam Azad.

Career
Khan made a brief appearance in his uncle Nasir Hussain's 1969 film Pyar Ka Mausam, playing Shashi Kapoor's role as a child at the age of three years. He made his film debut as an adult in 1988, playing a minor role as a villain in his brother Aamir's film Qayamat Se Qayamat Tak. He worked as an assistant director in his father's 1990 film Tum Mere Ho, which starred his brother Aamir in the lead.

Khan got his first leading role in the 1994 film Madhosh, which was produced by his father and directed by Vikram Bhatt. After a five-year hiatus, he made his comeback alongside his brother in Mela (2000). He appeared in several other films that fared poorly at the box office. He also appeared in the TV serial Aandhi in 2003. His last film was Chand Bujh Gaya in 2005.

After a decade long hiatus, it was announced that he would be making his comeback and star in the 2015 film Chinar Daastaan-E-Ishq, a film produced by Rajesh Jain. In 2017 he starred in Danger, a horror film directed by Faisal Saif. The film remains unreleased.

In 2021, he made his directorial debut and starred in the film Faactory as well as singing a song for the film.

Personal life
In 2007, Khan was reported missing for two days. He had filed a report to the police several days earlier accusing his brother Aamir of keeping him confined in his home because Aamir thought that his brother Faisal was mentally ill. He was eventually traced to Pune and brought back to Mumbai where he went through a medical examination. His brother Aamir and his father were in a custody battle over Faisal that garnered much press coverage. Faisal's custody was awarded to his father, Tahir.

Filmography

References

External links

1966 births
Living people
Male actors from Mumbai
Indian male film actors
Indian male television actors
Male actors in Hindi cinema
20th-century Indian male actors
21st-century Indian male actors